Lake Sakakawea is a large reservoir in the north central United States, impounded in 1953 by Garrison Dam, a U.S. Army Corps of Engineers dam located in the Missouri River basin in central North Dakota. Named for the Shoshone-Hidatsa woman Sakakawea (who accompanied the Lewis and Clark Expedition), it is the largest man-made lake located entirely within North Dakota, the second largest in the United States by area after Lake Oahe, and the third largest in the United States by volume, after Lake Mead and Lake Powell.

Lake Sakakawea marks the maximum southwest extent of glaciation during the ice age. The lake is located within the counties of: Dunn, McKenzie, McLean, Mercer, Mountrail, and Williams.

History

The reservoir was created by construction of Garrison Dam, part of a flood control and hydroelectric power generation project named the Pick-Sloan Project along the Missouri river. 
Garrison dam was completed in 1956. It is the second (and largest) of six main-stem dams on the Missouri River built and managed by the U.S. Army Corps of Engineers for flood control, hydroelectric power, navigation, and irrigation.

The creation of the lake displaced members of the Fort Berthold Indian Reservation from their villages of Van Hook and (Old) Sanish, which were inundated by creation of the lake. They relocated and founded the villages of New Town, White Shield, and Mandaree. One name that had been proposed for New Town was Vanish (a portmanteau of the two previous towns' names). Elbowoods, a third reservation town where the agency headquarters, boarding school, hospital, and jail were located, was also lost to the lake. These three towns are commemorated in the names of the three campground sections at Lake Sakakawea State Park, a state park located adjacent to Garrison Dam.

During a training flight in winter 1969, a U.S. Air Force interceptor aircraft crashed into the western portion of the lake on March 10. The pilot ejected safely to land and the plane sank below the frozen lake surface. It was not located until more than 35 years later, in September 2004, after an extended search by a local surveyors' group.

Recreation
The lake is a popular regional recreation destination for fishing, camping, boating, hiking, and other outdoor water-based recreation. Public recreation areas, parks, and wildlife management areas surround the lake and are managed by several agencies and organizations including the Corps of Engineers, North Dakota Department of Parks and Recreation, North Dakota Game and Fish Department, and the Fort Berthold Indian Reservation.  Lake Sakakawea State Park hosts the western terminus of the North Country National Scenic Trail, a 4,800-mile hiking trail that extends to Vermont.

See also
 Garrison Dam
 Missouri River
 Lake Audubon
 Pick-Sloan Plan
 U.S. Army Corps of Engineers
 Fort Berthold Indian Reservation
 North Dakota oil boom
 List of dams and reservoirs in North Dakota

References

External links 

 U.S. Army Corps of Engineers, Garrison Dam & Lake Sakakawea
 North Dakota Game and Fish Department
 North Dakota Parks and Recreation Department
 Lake Sakakawea History McLean County 

Buildings and structures in Dunn County, North Dakota
Buildings and structures in McKenzie County, North Dakota
Buildings and structures in McLean County, North Dakota
Buildings and structures in Mercer County, North Dakota
Buildings and structures in Mountrail County, North Dakota
Buildings and structures in Williams County, North Dakota
Protected areas of Dunn County, North Dakota
Protected areas of McKenzie County, North Dakota
Protected areas of McLean County, North Dakota
Protected areas of Mercer County, North Dakota
Protected areas of Mountrail County, North Dakota
Protected areas of Williams County, North Dakota
Reservoirs in North Dakota
Reservoirs of the Missouri River
Bodies of water of Dunn County, North Dakota
Bodies of water of McKenzie County, North Dakota
Bodies of water of McLean County, North Dakota
Bodies of water of Mercer County, North Dakota
Bodies of water of Mountrail County, North Dakota
Bodies of water of Williams County, North Dakota
Mandan, Hidatsa, and Arikara Nation